The Senate is the Upper House of  Parliament of Antigua and Barbuda. It consists of 17 members appointed by the Governor General. Ten members are appointed on the advice of the Prime Minister, four on the advice of the Leader of the Opposition, one on the advice of the Barbuda Council, one resident of Barbuda on the advice of the Prime Minister, and one at the Governor General's discretion. The current Senate convened on 26 March 2018, following the general election of 21 March.

The  President of the Senate is Senator the Hon. Alincia Williams-Grant, with Senator the Hon. Osbert Richard Frederick serving as Deputy President.

Members of the Senate
The following are the current members of the Antigua and Barbuda Senate.

See also
 List of presidents of the Senate of Antigua and Barbuda
 Parliament of Antigua and Barbuda
 Politics of Antigua and Barbuda
 House of Representatives of Antigua and Barbuda
 List of legislatures by country

References

Antigua
Government of Antigua and Barbuda